Xylorycta argentella is a moth in the family Xyloryctidae. It was described by Francis Walker in 1864. It is found in Australia, where it has been recorded from New South Wales.

The wingspan is 18–30 mm. The forewings are shining white, faintly ochreous tinged, more distinctly on the costal edge. The costal edge is very slenderly black on the basal fourth. The hindwings are light grey, becoming ochreous whitish towards the inner margin.

References

Xylorycta
Moths described in 1864